Maciej Bartoszek (born 12 April 1977) is a Polish football manager. He was most recently the manager of the Ekstraklasa club Wisła Płock.

Honours

Individual

Ekstraklasa Coach of the Season: 2016–17

References

External links
  Profile at igol.pl
 Maciej Bartoszek at Footballdatabase

1977 births
Living people
People from Włocławek
Sportspeople from Kuyavian-Pomeranian Voivodeship
Polish football managers
II liga managers
I liga managers
Ekstraklasa managers
GKS Bełchatów managers
Legionovia Legionowo managers
Zawisza Bydgoszcz managers
Korona Kielce managers
Bruk-Bet Termalica Nieciecza managers
Wisła Płock managers